Lay that Trumpet in Our Hands is a 2002 fiction novel by Susan Carol McCarthy. It describes the efforts of Reesa McMahon, a 12-year-old white girl, to understand and come to terms with the murder of her black friend Marvin Cully at the hands of the Ku Klux Klan. It details her growing awareness of race relations and racial hatred against the backdrop of the American Civil Rights Movement.

References 

 
 

2002 American novels
Novels about the Ku Klux Klan
American bildungsromans